The 14th South American Youth Championships in Athletics were held in Manaus, Brazil from October 23–25, 1998.

Medal summary
Medal winners are published for boys and girls.  Complete results can be found on the "World Junior Athletics History" website.

Men

Women

Medal table (unofficial)

Participation (unofficial)
Detailed result lists can be found on the "World Junior Athletics History" website.  An unofficial count yields the number of about 190 athletes from about 13 countries:  

 (17)
 (5)
 (54)
 (33)
 (22)
 (7)
 (4)
 Panama (2)
 (6)
 Peru (12)
 (1)
 (7)
 (20)

References

External links
World Junior Athletics History

South American U18 Championships in Athletics
1998 in Brazilian sport
South American U18 Championships
International athletics competitions hosted by Brazil
International sports competitions in Manaus
1998 in youth sport